The 1994 British Formula Three season was the 44th British Formula Three Championship, won by Jan Magnussen. The season started on 27 March at Silverstone and ended there on 2 October following eighteen races. 1994 saw the introduction of a new points-scoring system, with points now awarded down to tenth position, instead of only to sixth as previously, and all rounds counting towards the championship. Magnussen broke the series' previous win record held by 1983 champion Ayrton Senna by winning fourteen of the season's eighteen races. Class B was won by Duncan Vercoe.

Drivers and Teams

Race calendar and results

Championship Standings

Source:

References

External links
 The official website of the British Formula 3 Championship

Formula Three
British Formula Three Championship seasons